Bhubankhali is a village within the jurisdiction of the Jaynagar police station in the Jaynagar II CD block in the Baruipur subdivision of the South 24 Parganas district in the Indian state of West Bengal.

Geography

Demographics
As per 2011 Census of India, Bhubankhali had a total population of 6,949.

Transport
A short stretch of local roads link Bhubankhali to the Jaynagar-Jamtala Road.

Jaynagar Majilpur railway station is located nearby.

Healthcare
Sri Ramakrishna Rural Hospital, with 30 beds, at Nimpith, is the major government medical facility in the Jaynagar II CD block.

References

Villages in South 24 Parganas district
Neighbourhoods in Jaynagar Majilpur